Oliver Allan Almadro is a Filipino volleyball coach and is the head coach of the Petro Gazz Angels of the Premier Volleyball League and the Ateneo Blue Eagles women's volleyball team.

Education
Almadro attended the Colegio de San Juan de Letran. He attempted to secure a berth in Letran's men's volleyball team was unable to leading him to pursue a career in coaching instead.

Career
Almadro has been the head coach of the Ateneo de Manila University's volleyball teams which played in the University Athletic Association of the Philippines  (UAAP). He led the men's team to its first final appearance in three decade in Season 76 in 2014. This was followed by three-straight titles from Season 77 to 79.

In May 2018, he was named as head coach of Ateneo's women's team. At Season 81 (2019), his first UAAP run with the women's side, he led the lady spikers to a title. At Season 84 (2022) however, the team finished as semifinalist.

The Choco Mucho Flying Titans, a team formed in 2019, tapped Almadro as their head coach. The team first competed in the Premier Volleyball League (PVL) in the 2019 Open Conference. Almadro resigned from Choco Mucho in November 2022 to focus on his role as head coach of Ateneo de Manila's women's team.

In 2023, Almadro joins Petro Gazz Angels as their head coach starting the All-Filipino Conference There is no indication of him leaving Ateneo despite citing a need to focus on his duties with the school for leaving Choco Mucho.

Personal life
Almadro is a devout Roman Catholic and has three sons and a daughter. He is a devotee of the Black Nazarene.

References

Filipino volleyball coaches
Colegio de San Juan de Letran alumni